The southern mouse-colored tyrannulet (Nesotriccus murinus) is a species of bird in the tyrant flycatcher family Tyrannidae. It occurs in a wide range of scrubby and wooded habitats in tropical and subtropical South America, being absent from the southernmost part of the continent, the high Andes and dense rainforest. It is generally common, but its small size and dull plumage results in it often being overlooked – or at least not identified, as it resembles several other tyrant flycatchers.

Two subspecies are recognised:
 Nesotriccus murinus wagae (Taczanowski, 1884) – The Guianas, Amazonian Brazil, east Peru and northwest Bolivia 
 Nesotriccus murinus murinus (Spix, 1825) – south Brazil, south Bolivia, Paraguay and northwest Argentina

The southern mouse-colored tyrannulet was formerly considered conspecific with the Tumbesian tyrannulet (Nesotriccus tumbezanus) that occurs west of the Andes in southwest Ecuador and northwest Peru. The two species are visually very similar, but vocally distinct. It was also conspecific with the Cocos flycatcher, Nesotriccus ridgwayi .

References

External links
 Xeno-canto: audio recordings of the mouse-colored tyrannulet
"Mouse-colored tyrannulet" photo gallery VIREO

Nesotriccus
Birds of the Amazon Basin
Birds of the Guianas
Birds of Bolivia
Birds of Paraguay
[[Category:Birds of Argentina]
Birds of Brazil
Birds described in 1825
Taxonomy articles created by Polbot